Coprococcus is a genus of anaerobic cocci which are part of the human faecal microbiota. Despite the depletion of Coprococcus was found in colon cancer, there is no evidence for its protective role against colon cancer .

Three species have been described:
Coprococcus catus Holdeman and Moore 1974
Coprococcus comes Holdeman and Moore 1974
Coprococcus eutactus Holdeman and Moore 1974

C. comes may seem to play a role in cases of resistance against blood pressure medicine.

Etymology
'kopros' - excrement, faeces; 'kokkos' - berry; 'Coprococcus' - faecal coccus

References

Gut flora bacteria
Lachnospiraceae
Bacteria genera